The fourth wave of Russian emigration took place after the collapse of the Soviet Union in 1991 when people began migrating from Russia in large numbers. This wave continues into the present, with the 2022 Russian invasion of Ukraine leading to considerable Russian emigration associated with the invasion.

Economic and ethnic emigration 
In the 1990s, Russia suffered an economic depression. This caused some Russians to leave Russia. Emigration for ethnic reasons was especially strong with ethnic Germans going to Germany, Jews to Israel, and Greeks to Greece.

In the 2000s the flow of emigration gradually declined as the economy recovered, but then, from the starting of the 2010s, new bursts of political emigration arose, associated with the tightening of political rights.

Emigration following 2022 invasion of Ukraine 

Starting in February 2022, in connection with the 2022 Russian invasion of Ukraine, a new flow of political emigration began, associated with disagreement with the government. Following the announcement of mobilization on 21 September 2022, a huge surge in emigration from Russia occurred. Tickets to Armenia, Turkey, and Azerbaijan significantly increased, and car queues were formed at the border with Finland, Mongolia, and Kazakhstan.

See also

References

Books 

 Вишневский А. Г., Зайончковская Ж. А. Миграция из СССР: четвёртая волна // Рабочие доклады Центра демографии и экологии человека. — М., 1991. — Вып. 3 (декабрь).
 Полян П. Эмиграция: кто и когда в XX веке покидал Россию // Россия и её регионы в XX веке: территория — расселение — миграции / Под ред.  и . — М.: ОГИ, 2005.

Russian emigrants
1990s in Russia
2000s in Russia
2010s in Russia
2020s in Russia
Events affected by the 2022 Russian invasion of Ukraine